Hesperilla idothea, commonly known as the flame sedge-skipper, is a species of butterfly in the family Hesperiidae. It is found in the Australian states of New South Wales, Queensland, South Australia and Victoria.

The wingspan is about 40 mm.

The larvae feed on various sword grass species, including Gahnia aspera, Gahnia clarkei, Gahnia grandis, Gahnia melanocarpa, Gahnia radula, Gahnia sieberiana, Gahnia subaequiglumis and Gahnia trifida.

Subspecies
Hesperilla idothea clara Waterhouse, 1932 (South Australia)
Hesperilla idothea idothea (Miskin, 1889) (New South Wales, Queensland, South Australia, Victoria)

References

External links
Australian Insects
Australian Faunal Directory

Trapezitinae
Butterflies described in 1889
Butterflies of Australia